The prix littéraire de la vocation, established in 1976 by the fondation Marcel-Bleustein-Blanchet pour la vocation, is intended to help a young French-speaking novelist aged 18 to 30 years.

List of laureates 
1976: Les Régions céréalières by Jean-Marc Lovay, Éditions Gallimard (also bourse Cino Del Duca)
1977: Une fille pour l'hiver by Alain Leblanc, Groupe Flammarion
1978: Tristes Banlieues by Walter Prevost, Éditions Grasset
1981: Saad by Alain Blottière, Gallimard
1982: Loin d'Aswerda by Jean-Marie Laclavetine, Gallimard
1983: L'Exil de Taurus by Paul Le-Jéloux, Obsidiane
1984: Poisson d'amour by Didier Van Cauwelaert, Éditions du Seuil
1985: Bravoure by Emmanuel Carrère, 
1986: La Salle de bain by Jean-Philippe Toussaint, Éditions de Minuit
1989: Duo forte by Éric Holder, Grasset
1992: Le Lycée des artistes by Jean-Marc Parisis, Grasset
1993: Le Sabotage amoureux by Amélie Nothomb, Albin Michel
1995: Absinthe by Christophe Bataille, éditions Arléa
1996: Les Funambules by Antoine Bello, Gallimard
1997: Le Grenadier by Dominique Mainard, Gallimard
1999 : Porte de la Paix Céleste by Shan Sa, Éditions du Rocher
2000: Sauvageons by Benjamin Berton, Gallimard
2001: Le Chien d'Ulysse by Salim Bachi, Gallimard
2002: L'Absolue Perfection du crime by Tanguy Viel, Éditions de Minuit
2003: Chlore by Thibault Lang-Willar, Éditions Denoël
2004: Génération spontanée by Christophe Ono-Dit-Biot, Plon
2005: L'Angoisse de la première phrase by Bernard Quiriny, Éditions Phébus
2006: Un baiser à la russe by Gaspard Koenig, Grasset (also Prix Jean-Freustié)
2007: Supplément au roman national by Jean-Éric Boulin, Stock
2008: Jeune Professionnel by Guillaume Noyelle, éditions Bartillat
2009: Chute libre by Émilie de Turckheim, éditions du Rocher
2010: Les Veilleurs by Vincent Message, Le Seuil.
2011: ex æquo L'Envers des autres by Kaouther Adimi, éditions Actes Sud and Requiem pour Lola rouge by Pierre Ducrozet, Grasset
2012: The Truth About the Harry Quebert Affair by Joël Dicker, 
2013: Tu montreras ma tête au peuple by François-Henri Désérable, Gallimard
2014: Constellation by Adrien Bosc, Stock
2015: Le Voyage d'Octavio by Miguel Bonnefoy, Éditions Rivages
2016: L'éveil by Line Papin, Stock

See also

External links 
 Fondation Marcel-Bleustein-Blanchet
 Prix littéraire de la vocation 2016 on Libre Hebdo
 Prix de la Vocation de la Fondation Marcel Bleustein-Blanchet on Étudiant de Paris

French literary awards
Awards established in 1976
1976 establishments in France